Events during the year 2010 in Northern Ireland.

Incumbents
 First Minister - Peter Robinson
Acting First Minister - Arlene Foster (11 January - 3 February)  
 deputy First Minister - Martin McGuiness 
 Secretary of State - Shaun Woodward (until 11 May), Owen Paterson (from 11 May)

Events

January
6 January – Ulster Defence Association (UDA) confirms that all weaponry under its control has been put verifiably beyond use.
8 January – PSNI Constable Peadar Heffron seriously injured as a bomb explodes under his car in Randalstown. Dissident republicans have been blamed for the attack.
8 January – Iris Robinson scandal emerges.
11 January – Peter Robinson temporarily steps aside as First Minister, designating Arlene Foster to act in his place.
20 January – Talks between Sinn Féin and the DUP about the devolution of policing and justice powers to the Northern Ireland administration come to an end.
23 January – Sinn Féin party executive meets to discuss talks position.
25 January – Prime Minister, Gordon Brown and Taoiseach Brian Cowen travel to Hillsborough Castle for talks with the parties.
26 January – The two Prime Ministers remain in the Hillsborough Castle talks and all-party discussions begin.
27 January – The two Prime Ministers leave without an agreement being reached, giving the parties 48 hours to reach agreement, otherwise the governments would publish plans for moving the political process forward.
31 January – Talks, which have continued all week, break for the day with reports of "considerable progress" having been made.
31 January – At the annual Bloody Sunday commemoration march, the victim's families call for the immediate release of the delayed Saville Inquiry report.

February
3 February – Peter Robinson resumes role as First Minister, but has yet to convince his party to accept a deal.
5 February – Justice and policing powers to be devolved to Northern Ireland's power-sharing government from 12 April 2010 following agreement between Sinn Féin and the DUP. Endorsed by presence of British and Irish Prime Ministers.
6 February – Mark Durkan delivers his final address to the SDLP as party leader at its annual conference in Newcastle, County Down, where a new leader will be elected.
7 February – SDLP elect Margaret Ritchie (current Minister for Social Development) as new party leader, becoming the first female leader of a major NI party.
19 February – Mortar bomb is abandoned near a police station in Keady, supposedly by Dissident republicans, leading to a long security alert.
22 February – Car bomb weighing up to 250 lbs explodes outside Newry Courthouse damaging buildings. No-one was killed or injured and Dissident republicans are blamed for the attack.

March
9 March – Cross-community vote on devolving policing and justice powers to be held in the NI Assembly.
17 March – Peter Robinson and Martin McGuinness to meet President of the United States Barack Obama in Washington, D.C.

April
12 April – Justice and policing powers to be devolved to Northern Ireland's power-sharing government.

May
6 May – 2010 UK General Election takes place and the results for Northern Ireland are: Democratic Unionist Party (8 Seats), Sinn Féin (5 Seats), SDLP (3 Seats), Alliance (1 Seat) and Independent (1 Seat). The First Minister of Northern Ireland Peter Robinson lost his seat of Belfast East to Naomi Long of the Alliance Party, giving the Alliance Party its first Westminster seat since 1974.

July
11 to 14 July - 2010 Northern Ireland riots occur.

September
22 September – Tom Elliott is elected to be leader of the Ulster Unionist Party (UUP).

November
14 November – Sinn Féin president Gerry Adams announces that he plans to step down as an MP and Stormont assembly member to stand for election in the Irish Republic.

December
29 December – Thousands of bottles of bottled water are sent to Northern Ireland by the Scottish Government to help supply households cut off from mains supplies

Arts and literature
26 January – Blue plaque unveiled at Montrose Street South, Ballymacarrett, Belfast, the location of the house playwright Sam Thompson was born in, on 50th anniversary of the first performance of his controversial play Over The Bridge.
26 January – Formation of Opera Company NI is announced, funded by the Arts Council of Northern Ireland, and incorporating the best resources from Castleward Opera and Opera Fringe.
31 January – Successful Belfast4Haiti music events are held in Belfast – One day, One cause, 50 Acts.
15–30 October – 48th Ulster Bank Belfast Festival at Queen's.
Miriam Gamble's poetry collection The Squirrels Are Dead is published.

Sport
21 January – Kris Meeke, winner of the Intercontinental Rally Challenge title in 2009, crashes out of the Monte Carlo Rally for the second year running.
23 January – Antrim International Cross Country Races.
3 May – Deep RiverRock Belfast City Marathon.
26–30 July – Northern Ireland Milk Cup 2010, Coleraine.

Rugby Union
6 January – Ireland 29-11 Italy
13 February – France 33-10 Ireland
27 February – England 16-20 Ireland
13 March – Ireland-Wales
20 March – Ireland-Scotland

GAA
 17 March – St. Galls (Antrim) defeat Kilmurry Ibrickane (Clare) to win the All-Ireland Senior Club Football Championship for the first time in club history.
 18 July – Tyrone defeat Monaghan to win the Ulster Senior Football Championship.
 19 September – Cork defeat Down to win the All-Ireland Senior Football Championship, while Tyrone defeat Cork in the Minor final.

Deaths
12 January – Allen McClay, businessman and philanthropist (born 1932)
30 September – Sir Barry Shaw, barrister, first Director of Public Prosecutions for Northern Ireland (born 1923)

See also
2010 in England
2010 in Scotland
2010 in Wales

References